The Workers' Initiative ( or IP) is a Polish anarcho-syndicalist trade union. IP was established in the second half of 2001 as an informal anarchists group whose objective was the common struggle for workers' rights. As a formal nationwide anarcho-syndicalist trade union IP began to act in September 2004.

The Workers' Initiative participated in protests against group layoffs at H. Cegielski – Poznań, at Poczta Polska, at an Auchan shopping center, and for healthcare. Members also participated in the counter-protest to a 2012 neonazi march in Frankfurt an der Oder.

References

External links
 Workers' Initiative
 Inicjatywa Pracownicza

2001 establishments in Poland
Anarchist organizations in Poland
Anarcho-syndicalism
Libertarian socialist organizations
National trade union centers of Poland
Trade unions established in 2001
Trade unions in Poland
Syndicalist trade unions